Chodkiewicz (Gryf z Mieczem) is a Polish coat of arms. It was used by the Chodkiewicz family in the times of the Polish–Lithuanian Commonwealth. A variant of the Kościesza with the Gryf coat of arms and the notable longer family line as well as much bigger family than shown here.

Notable bearers
Notable bearers of this coat of arms include:
Chodkiewicz family
Chodko Jurewicz (c.1431–1447), founder of Chodkiewicz clan
Ivan Chodkiewicz (?–1484), founder of the Chodkiewicz family
Aleksander Chodkiewicz (1457–1549), voivode of the Nowogródek Voivodeship, Grand Marshal of Lithuania
Yurii Chodkiewicz (1524–1569), voivode of the Nowogródek Voivodeship
Hieronim Chodkiewicz (1500–1561), Grand Lithuanian Podczaszy, Elder of Samogitia, Count of the Roman Empire
Ivan Hieronimowicz Chodkiewicz (1537–1579), Livonian hetman, Grand Lithuanian Marshall, castellan of Vilnius.
Grzegorz Chodkiewicz (?–1572), Grand Hetman of Lithuania
Jan Karol Chodkiewicz (1560–1621), Grand Hetman of Lithuania
Krzysztof Chodkiewicz (?–1652), castellan of Vilnius, voivode of Vilnius Voivodship
Jan Kazimierz Chodkiewicz (1616–1660), castellan of Vilnius
Anna Eufrozyna Chodkiewicz (c. 1600 – c. 1631), married Prokop Sieniawski in 1623
Teresa Chodkiewicz (1645–1672), married Stanisław Bonifacy Krasiński about 1667
Jan Mikołaj Chodkiewicz  father of Rozalia Lubomirska 1768-1794

Gallery

See also
 Polish heraldry
 Heraldic family
 List of Polish nobility coats of arms

Bibliography
 Herbarz polski, Tadeusz Gajl, Gdańsk 2007,

References

Polish coats of arms

pl:Chodkiewicz (herb szlachecki)